John Morgan (3 September 1943 – 23 June 2006) was an English professional golfer who competed on the European Tour in the 1970s and 80s.

Morgan was born in Oxford. For much of his career, he was also the club professional at Royal Liverpool, one of only a few touring professionals still to maintain a club role at that time. He seriously competed at the 1974 Open Championship. He was tied for the lead with the eventual champion Gary Player after the first round and remained in the top ten after rounds 2 and 3. He ultimately finished T-13. He won one tournament on the European Tour, the 1986 Jersey Open, when he overcame Peter Fowler in a play-off. During the 1970s and 1980s he also competed in Africa on the Safari Circuit, where he won four times, including the Nigerian Open and the Ivory Coast Open.

After turning 50, Morgan played on the European Seniors Tour and the Champions Tour. He won the John Jacobs Trophy (European Seniors Order of Merit) in 1994, and was runner up in 1995 and 1996. He won eight European Seniors Tour tournaments including the PGA Seniors Championship twice. He had 59 top-10 finishes, of which 21 were top-3 and 100 top-20 finishes on the European Senior Tour.

Morgan died of a brain tumour at the age of 62. He left behind a wife and four children.

Professional wins (15)

European Tour wins (1)

European Tour playoff record (1–0)

Safari Circuit wins (3)
1979 Nigerian Open, Lusaka Open
1982 Ivory Coast Open

Other wins (2)
1986 Sierra Leone Open
1992 Cyprus Open

European Senior Tour wins (8)

European Senior Tour playoff record (2–0)

Other senior wins (1)
2004 New Zealand Seniors PGA Championship

Results in major championships

Note: Morgan only played in The Open Championship.

CUT = missed the half-way cut (3rd round cut in 1975 Open Championship)
"T" = tied

Team appearances
PGA Cup/Diamondhead Cup: 1973, 1979 (winners), 1981 (tie)
Praia d'El Rey European Cup: 1997 (winners), 1999

References

External links

English male golfers
European Tour golfers
PGA Tour Champions golfers
European Senior Tour golfers
Deaths from brain tumor
1943 births
2006 deaths